The Soldier and the Gentlewoman is a 1932 novel by Welsh English-language writer Hilda Vaughan.

References

 The Soldier and the Gentlewoman re-print for the Welsh Women's Classics series, Honno Press

1932 British novels
Victor Gollancz Ltd books
Charles Scribner's Sons books